Léon Devos (17 January 1896 – 23 August 1963) was a Belgian racing cyclist who won Liège–Bastogne–Liège in 1919 and the Tour of Flanders in 1922.

Palmarès 

1919
Liège–Bastogne–Liège
1922
Tour of Flanders
1924
Kampioenschap van Vlaanderen

References 

1896 births
1963 deaths
Belgian male cyclists
People from Ardooie
Cyclists from West Flanders